Roger de Saint-Lary de Termes, duc de Bellegarde (10 December 156213 July 1646 in Paris), nephew of Roger de Saint-Lary de Bellegarde, was a French duke.

Life
Born as son to Jean de Saint-Lary (died in 1586), who was a military governor of Metz, he was brought to court by the duke of Épernon. He quickly became a favourite of Henry III and maintained this position during the reigns of Henry IV, and Louis XIII. It was also during the reign of Henry III that he became royal master of the horse, whereas he received his title of governor of Burgundy in 1602 after his involvement against the Biron conspiracy.

His estate of Seurre in Burgundy was created a duchy in the peerage of France (duché-pairie) in his favour under the name of Bellegarde, in 1619. In 1645 the title of this duchy was transferred to the estate of Choisy-aux-Loges in Gâtinais. He was an illustrious noble at the French court who sided with Gaston, Duke of Orléans. During the very difficult years of 1629 and 1630, in which Marie de Medici and Gaston had reputadely allied against Cardinal Richelieu, there were rumours that Bellegarde kept their agreement in a precious necklace he wore at court. After the Day of Dupes, in  1631, when Gaston tried to rally an army against the king but failed, Bellegarde let him pass through his estates to Lorraine and yet tried afterwards to rally people in his own district against the king. Upon hearing that, the king started moving towards Burgundy with an army, so Bellegarde fled after the king had taken Dijon and had forced the Parlement to issue an edict against Gaston's followers. Bellegarde's governorship was therefore given to Henri, Prince of Condé (1588-1646). However, because of his importance, he was already forgiven in 1632 by Richelieu, so that he could return to France

References

Attribution

Dukes of Bellegarde
1646 deaths
1562 births
Peers created by Louis XIII